Elachista kilmunella is a moth of the family Elachistidae found in Europe.

Description
Adults are on wing from May to August. The head is grey, whitish sprinkled. Forewings are dark grey, basal area in female whitish ; a nearly straight fascia before middle, a tornal spot and costal spot beyond it united into a rather irregular fascia whitish, in female clearer ; cilia round apex more whitish. Hindwings are  rather dark grey.

Biology

The larvae feed on greater pond sedge (Carex riparia) and  hare's-tail cottongrass (Eriophorum vaginatum) mining the leaves of their host plant. They are yellowish grey. Larvae can be found from April to July.

Distribution
It is found from northern Europe to the Alps and Hungary and from Ireland to Russia.

References

kilmunella
Leaf miners
Moths described in 1849
Moths of Europe
Taxa named by Henry Tibbats Stainton